The Montague Burton Professorships of Industrial Relations are three professorships in industrial relations at the University of Cambridge, Cardiff University and the University of Leeds. The professorships were established between 1929–30 and endowed by Sir Montague Maurice Burton, founder of Burton Menswear.

Cambridge 

The Cambridge professorship was established on 14 November 1930. It is assigned to the Faculty of Economics.

List of Montague Burton Professors at Cambridge 

 1931–1943 John Hilton 
 1944–1963 Harold Stewart Kirkaldy
 1964–1983 Herbert Arthur Frederick Turner
 1985–2012 William Arthur Brown
 2013– Coenraad Nicolaas Teulings

Cardiff

List of Montague Burton Professors at Cardiff 
 1951–66 Michael Patrick Fogarty
 1969–89 George Thomason

Leeds

List of Montague Burton Professors at Leeds 
 1930-55 John Henry Richardson
 1961–63 Herbert Arthur Frederick Turner
 1968-89 Rodney Crossley
 1990–2012 Peter Nolan
 2012– Mark Stuart

References 

Cambridge University database

Industrial Relations, Burton, Montague
School of the Humanities and Social Sciences, University of Cambridge
Industrial relations education
1930 establishments in England